Sixty Years a Queen is a 1913 British silent historical film directed by Bert Haldane and starring Blanche Forsythe, Louie Henri and Fred Paul.

Outline
The film portrays the six decade-long reign of Queen Victoria, serving as a wider depiction of the Victorian era and its leading British figures. It was based on the 1897 non-fiction work of the same title by Sir Herbert Maxwell, 7th Baronet which had been written to celebrate Victoria's Diamond Jubilee.

Production
The film was conceived in 1912 at a meeting between G. B. Samuelson and his brother Julian Wylie. Samuelson was looking for his first film project, and later brought in Will Barker as his co-producer. The picture was largely filmed at Barker's newly built Ealing Studios, where Barker gained a reputation for extravagant productions, often historical.

A great deal of money was invested in Sixty Years a Queen, and more than a thousand actors and extras were employed, on many locations. There was also much advance publicity. The picture was a great success at the box-offices, making the producers a profit of some £35,000.

More than twenty years later Herbert Wilcox made a similar film, Sixty Glorious Years, which was also very popular.

Cast
 Blanche Forsythe as Queen Victoria (younger) 
 Louie Henri as Queen Victoria (older) 
 Fred Paul as Archbishop of Canterbury  
 Roy Travers as Prince Albert
 Gilbert Esmond as Duke of Wellington  
 E. Story Gofton as W.E. Gladstone
 Rolf Leslie as 27 Different Roles 
 J. Hastings Batson
 Alfred Bailey Groves as Prince Edward

References

Bibliography
 Oakley, Charles. Where We Came In: Seventy Years of the British Film Industry. Routledge, 2013.

External links

1913 films
1910s historical drama films
British silent feature films
British biographical drama films
British historical drama films
Films set in London
Films set in England
Films set in the 19th century
Films directed by Bert Haldane
British black-and-white films
Cultural depictions of Queen Victoria on film
1910s biographical drama films
1913 drama films
1910s English-language films
1910s British films
Silent historical drama films